Emo Gurram Egaravachu is a 2014 Telugu-language romantic comedy film directed by Chandra Siddhartha . It stars Sumanth and Pinky Sawika Chaiyadech. The latter made her debut in Telugu cinema through this film and it is Sumanth's second feature with Chandra Siddhartha after the 2007 hit Madhumasam. S. S. Kanchi wrote the screenplay and M. M. Keeravani provided the soundtrack for this film. 
It released on 25 January 2014 to a sub par response  at the box office. Sumanth's performance was however praised by critics. The film's title is based on a song from Rambantu (1996).

Cast
Sumanth as Bullebbayi
Sawika Chaiyadech as Neelaveni
Harsha Vardhan as Prabhakar, Neelaveni's paternal uncle
Raksha as Neelaveni's mother
Asmita as Neelaveni's aunt
SS Kanchi as GD Naidu
Tagubothu Ramesh as Ammiraju
Sudha as Bullebbayi's mother
Annapoorna as Bullebbayi's grandmother
Pavala Syamala
Sivannarayana Naripeddi

Soundtrack 

Music composed by M. M. Keeravaani. Music release released by Vel Records.

References

2014 films
2010s Telugu-language films
Films scored by M. M. Keeravani